At the 1956 Summer Olympics, seven fencing events were contested, six for men and one for women.

Medal summary

Men's events

Women's events

Medal table

Participating nations
A total of 165 fencers (142 men and 23 women) from 23 nations competed at the Melbourne Games:

References

 
1956 Summer Olympics events
1956
1956 in fencing
International fencing competitions hosted by Australia